Norman Parke (born 22 December 1986) is a Northern Irish mixed martial artist. A professional MMA competitor since 2006, Parke has fought for the UFC, Absolute Championship Berkut, KSW, and BAMMA. He was also a competitor for Team UK on The Ultimate Fighter: The Smashes in late 2012 and won the Lightweight Tournament.

Background
Born and raised in Bushmills, Northern Ireland, Parke began training in Judo at the age of 16. He went on to be a National Champion in Judo as well as Freestyle Wrestling in 2009-2010 and 2011–2012. Later, after he also began training in boxing, Parke transitioned into mixed martial arts at the age of 20.

Mixed martial arts career

Early career
Before signing with the UFC, Parke compiled a record of 16–2, with 12 of his victories coming via submission. Parke's losses were against the veteran Greg Loughran and the then-undefeated Joseph Duffy.

Parke was introduced to the masses and given his first televised fight by Cage Contender on 24 July 2010, going on to fight for the promotion more times than anywhere else. In his last fight under the Cage Contender banner, Parke claimed the vacant Cage Contender Lightweight Championship.

After going 14–2, Parke signed to face Anton Kuivanen at Fight Festival 29, in what would have been his first fight outside Ireland and the United Kingdom. However, the fight did not materialise and Kuivanen fought another fighter on the card. After a further victory domestically, Parke signed with Cage Warriors to face Brad Wheeler in February 2012. However, Parke withdrew after a hand injury. Parke returned in May 2012, where he defeated Stephen Coll via TKO, in what turned out to be his final appearance before joining The Ultimate Fighter.

The Ultimate Fighter
In late 2012, Parke signed to be a competitor on The Ultimate Fighter: The Smashes - a regional version of the Ultimate Fighter series, which pitted Australian fighters against British fighters. Parke competed in the lightweight division and his first opponent in the show was Richie Vaculik, who currently competes at flyweight. Parke was able to hit Vaculik on the ground with elbows; one of which cut Vaculik on the top of his head. Parke was able to take Vaculik down again in the second round and controlled the fight from half-guard. Parke defeated Vaculik via unanimous decision to move onto the semi-final round.

In the semi-final round, Parke was matched up against fellow Team UK fighter Brendan Loughnane. Parke won the fight via unanimous decision and moved onto the finals which took place live on UFC on FX: Sotiropoulos vs. Pearson.

Ultimate Fighting Championship
Parke made his UFC debut on 15 December 2012 at UFC on FX 6 which was also known as "The Ultimate Fighter: The Smashes Finale". Parke would fight Colin Fletcher to determine the lightweight winner of The Ultimate Fighter: The Smashes. Parke controlled the entirety of the fight and won the fight via unanimous decision.

Parke was expected to face Jon Tuck on 20 April 2013 at UFC on Fox 7. However, the bout was scrapped during the week leading up to the event as Tuck was forced out of the bout with an injury.

Parke fought Kazuki Tokudome on 6 July 2013 at UFC 162. He won the fight by unanimous decision.

A rescheduled bout with Jon Tuck eventually took place on 26 October 2013 at UFC Fight Night 30. Parke won the fight via unanimous decision.

Parke faced TUF: Brazil 2 winner Leonardo Santos at UFC Fight Night 38. Due to a point deduction for Parke grabbing Santos' shorts, the bout ended in a majority draw.

Parke faced returning veteran Naoyuki Kotani on 19 July 2014 at UFC Fight Night 46 in Dublin. He won the fight via TKO in the second round.

Parke was expected to face Diego Sanchez on 15 November 2014 at UFC 180. However, Parke pulled out of the bout in early October citing a knee injury and was replaced by Joe Lauzon.

Parke was expected to face Jorge Masvidal on 18 January 2015 at UFC Fight Night 59. However, in early December, Masvidal pulled out of the bout citing an injury and was replaced by Gleison Tibau. Parke lost the fight via split decision.

Parke was expected to face Gilbert Burns on 30 May 2015 at UFC Fight Night 67. However, Burns pulled out of the fight in late April and was replaced by Francisco Trinaldo. Parke lost the fight via split decision.

Parke faced returning veteran Reza Madadi on 24 October 2015 at UFC Fight Night 76. He won the fight by unanimous decision.

Parke faced Rustam Khabilov on 27 February 2016 at UFC Fight Night 84. He lost the fight via unanimous decision.

Following the loss to Khabilov, Parke was released by the UFC.

Absolute Championship Berkut
Parke faced Andrew Fisher on 1 October 2016 at ACB 47: Braveheart. He won the fight via unanimous decision.

BAMMA
On 24 February 2017, Parke made his debut for the BAMMA organization. He faced Paul Redmond at BAMMA 28 and won the fight by majority decision.

KSW
Parke signed with Polish promotion KSW and made his debut at KSW 39: Colosseum on May 27, 2017, for the KSW Lightweight Championship against champion Mateusz Gamrot. He lost the bout via unanimous decision.

Parke rematched Mateusz Gamrot at KSW 40: Dublin on October 22, 2017. After the bout was stopped due to eye pokes that left Parke unable to continue, Parke shoved Gamrot's cornerman,Borys Mankowski, which resulted in Marcin Bilman, another professional fighter who was in the champion's corner, responded by landing a punch on Parke. Gamrot was subsequently fined 30% of his purse and Bilman has been handed a two-year ban from KSW events.

After a few bouts in the KSW and Brave CF, it was announced on 14 July 2018 that Parke had signed a multi-fight contract with Bellator. Despite the contract with Bellator, Parke faced former KSW Welterweight Champion Borys Mankowski at KSW 47 on 23 March 2019 and won the bout via unanimous decision.

After defeating the former KSW Featherweight Champion Artur Sowiński via unanimous decision at KSW 49: Soldić vs. Kaszubowski, Parke was expected to face Marian Ziółkowski for the interim KSW Lightweight Championship at KSW 50 on 14 September 2019. However, Ziółkowski was forced to withdraw from the bout due to an injury and was replaced by former KSW Featherweight Champion Marcin Wrzosek. Parke won the fight by split decision.

Parke faced Mateusz Gamrot in a trilogy bout at KSW 53 on 11 July 2020. The bout was expected to be the Lightweight Championship unification bout, but Parke was unable to make weight thus the title is not on the line. Parke lost the fight via doctor stoppage in the third round.

Fame MMA

On February 28, during the Second Press Conference before Fame 9, a boxing fight between Norman Parke and a former amateur boxer, Polish championship medalist Kasjusz "Don Kasjo" Życiński was announced.

On March 26, 2022, Parke faced rapper Popek at Fame 13. He won after Popek broke his hand less than a minute into the bout and was unable to continue.

Parke faced Grzegorz Szulakowski on July 9, 2022 at Prime Show MMA 2, winning the bout via unanimous decision.

Parke faced Junior Orgulho on March 11, 2023 at Hexagone MMA 7, winning the bout via unanimous decision.

Championships and accomplishments
Konfrontacja Sztuk Walki
Interim KSW Lightweight Championship (One time)
Fight of the Night (Two times) vs. Borys Mańkowski (KSW 47), Marcin Wrzosek (KSW 50)
Ultimate Fighting Championship
The Ultimate Fighter: The Smashes Lightweight Winner
Cage Contender
Cage Contender Lightweight Champion (One time)

Mixed martial arts record

|-
|Win
|align=center|31–7–1 (1)
|Junior Orgulho
|Decision (unanimous)
|Hexagone MMA 7
|
|align=center|3
|align=center|5:00
|Poitiers, France
|
|-
|Win
|align=center| 30–7–1 (1)
|Grzegorz Szulakowski
|Decision (unanimous)
|Prime Show MMA 2
|
|align=center|3
|align=center|5:00
|Gdynia, Poland
|
|-
|Win
|align=center| 29–7–1 (1)
|Paweł Mikołajuw
|TKO (hand injury)
|Fame 13: Nitro vs. Unboxall
|
|align=center|1
|align=center|0:37
|Gliwice, Poland
|
|-
|Loss
|align=center| 28–7–1 (1)
|Mateusz Gamrot
|TKO (doctor stoppage)
|KSW 53: Reborn
| 
|align=center|3
|align=center|3:02 
|Warsaw, Poland
|
|-
|Win
|align=center| 28–6–1 (1)
|Marcin Wrzosek
|Decision (split) 
|KSW 50: London
| 
|align=center|5 
|align=center|5:00 
|London, England
|
|-
|Win
|align=center| 27–6–1 (1)
|Artur Sowiński
|Decision (unanimous)
|KSW 49: Soldić vs. Kaszubowski
|
|align=center|3
|align=center|5:00
|Gdańsk/Sopot, Poland
|
|-
|Win
|align=center|26–6–1 (1) 
| Borys Mańkowski
|Decision (unanimous)
|KSW 47: The X-Warriors
|
|align=center| 3 
|align=center| 5:00
|Łódź, Poland
|
|-
|Win
|align=center|25–6–1 (1)
| Myles Price
|Decision (unanimous)
|BRAVE 13
|
|align=center| 3
|align=center| 5:00
|Belfast, Northern Ireland
|
|-
|Win
|align=center|24–6–1 (1)
| Łukasz Chlewicki
|Decision (unanimous)
|KSW 43: Soldić vs. Du Plessis
|
|align=center| 3
|align=center| 5:00
|Wrocław, Poland
|
|-
|NC
|align=center|
| Mateusz Gamrot
|No Contest (accidental eye poke)
|KSW 40: Dublin
|
|align=center|2
|align=center|4:39
|Dublin, Republic of Ireland
|
|-
|Loss
|align=center|23–6–1
| Mateusz Gamrot
|Decision (unanimous)
| KSW 39: Colosseum
|
|align=center| 3
|align=center| 5:00
|Warsaw, Poland
|
|-
|Win
|align=center|23–5–1
| Paul Redmond
|Decision (majority)
|BAMMA 28
|
|align=center| 3
|align=center| 5:00
|Belfast, Northern Ireland
|
|-
|Win
|align=center|22–5–1
| Andrew Fisher
|Decision (unanimous)
|ACB 47: Braveheart: Young Eagles 14
|
|align=center| 3
|align=center| 5:00
|Glasgow, Scotland
|
|-
|Loss
|align=center|21–5–1
| Rustam Khabilov
| Decision (unanimous)
|UFC Fight Night: Silva vs. Bisping
|
|align=center| 3
|align=center| 5:00
|London, England
|
|-
|Win
|align=center|21–4–1
| Reza Madadi
|Decision (unanimous)
|UFC Fight Night: Holohan vs. Smolka
|
|align=center|3
|align=center|5:00
|Dublin, Republic of Ireland
|
|-
|Loss
|align=center|20–4–1
| Francisco Trinaldo
|Decision (split)
|UFC Fight Night: Condit vs. Alves
|
|align=center|3
|align=center|5:00
|Goiânia, Brazil
|
|-
|Loss
|align=center|20–3–1
| Gleison Tibau
|Decision (split)
|UFC Fight Night: McGregor vs. Siver
|
|align=center|3
|align=center|5:00
|Boston, Massachusetts, United States
|
|-
|Win
|align=center|20–2–1
| Naoyuki Kotani
|TKO (punches)
|UFC Fight Night: McGregor vs. Brandao
|
|align=center|2
|align=center|3:41
|Dublin, Republic of Ireland
|
|-
|Draw
|align=center|
| Leonardo Santos
|Draw (majority)
|UFC Fight Night: Shogun vs. Henderson 2
|
|align=center|3
|align=center|5:00
|Natal, Brazil
|
|-
|Win
|align=center|19–2
| Jon Tuck
|Decision (unanimous)
|UFC Fight Night: Machida vs. Munoz
|
|align=center|3
|align=center|5:00
|Manchester, England
|
|-
|Win
|align=center|18–2
| Kazuki Tokudome
||Decision (unanimous)
|UFC 162
|
|align=center|3
|align=center|5:00
|Las Vegas, Nevada, United States
|
|-
|Win
|align=center|17–2
|Colin Fletcher
|Decision (unanimous)
|UFC on FX: Sotiropoulos vs. Pearson
|
|align=center|3
|align=center|5:00
|Gold Coast, Australia
|
|-
|Win
|align=center|16–2
|Stephen Coll
|TKO (punches)
|Immortal Fight Championship 6
|
|align=center|3
|align=center|2:24
|Donegal, Republic of Ireland
|
|-
|Win
|align=center|15–2
| Marcos Nardini
|Decision (unanimous)
|CC 11: Robinson vs. Wain
|
|align=center|3
|align=center|5:00
|Belfast, Northern Ireland
|
|-
|Win
|align=center|14–2
| Dominic McConnell
|Submission (arm-triangle choke)
|Immortal Fighting Championship 3
|
|align=center|3
|align=center|1:23
|Tyrone, Northern Ireland
|
|-
|Win
|align=center|13–2
| Stuart Davies
|TKO (punches)
|CC 6: Nelson vs. Mitchell
|
|align=center|2
|align=center|2:34
|Manchester, England
|
|-
|Win
|align=center|12–2
| Tom Maguire
|Submission (guillotine choke)
|CC 5: McVeigh vs. Sitenkov
|
|align=center|2
|align=center|0:42
|Dublin, Republic of Ireland
|
|-
|Win
|align=center|11–2
| Ian Jones
|Submission (guillotine choke)
|Fight-Stars 2
|
|align=center|1
|align=center|4:18
|Leeds, England
|
|-
|Loss
|align=center|10–2
| Joseph Duffy
|Submission (rear-naked choke)
|Spartan Fight Challenge
|
|align=center|1
|align=center|3:06
|Newport, Wales
|
|-
|Win
|align=center|10–1
| Myles Price
|Submission (guillotine choke)
|CC 3: Featherweight Tournament
|
|align=center|1
|align=center|3:27
|Antrim, Northern Ireland
|
|-
|Win
|align=center|9–1
| Ben Davis
|Submission (rear-naked choke)
|TW 5: Night of Champions
|
|align=center|1
|align=center|3:10
|Connacht, Republic of Ireland
|
|-
|Win
|align=center|8–1
| Ali MacLean
|Submission (rear-naked choke)
|Immortal Fighting Championship 1
|
|align=center|2
|align=center|4:05
|Tyrone, Northern Ireland
|
|-
|Win
|align=center|7–1
| Mick Bowman
|Submission (rear-naked choke)
|OMMAC 1: Assassins
|
|align=center|1
|align=center|2:06
|Liverpool, England
|
|-
|Win
|align=center|6–1
| Mark Mills
|TKO (punches)
|Strike and Submit 11
|
|align=center|3
|align=center|3:40
|Gateshead, England
|
|-
|Win
|align=center|5–1
| Paul Jenkins
|Submission (rear-naked choke)
|HOP 11: Taking Over
|
|align=center|1
|align=center|2:41
|Newport, Wales
|
|-
|Win
|align=center|4–1
| Dominic McConnell
|Submission (armbar)
|Chaos FC 4
|
|align=center|1
|align=center|1:10
|Derry, Northern Ireland
|
|-
|Win
|align=center|3–1
| Barry Oglesby
|Submission (leglock)
|TW 4: The Next Generation
|
|align=center|1
|align=center|3:30
|Connacht, Republic of Ireland
|
|-
|Win
|align=center|2–1
| Ali McLean
|Submission (rear-naked choke)
|Ultimate Fighting Revolution 14
|
|align=center|2
|align=center|4:50
|Belfast, Northern Ireland
|
|-
|Win
|align=center|1–1
| Brian Kerr
|Submission (armbar)
|Ultimate Fighting Revolution 13
|
|align=center|1
|align=center|2:10
|Belfast, Northern Ireland
|
|-
|Loss
|align=center|0–1
| Greg Loughran
|Submission (rear-naked choke)
|Ultimate Fighting Revolution 5
|
|align=center|1
|align=center|1:43
|Toomebridge, Northern Ireland
|
|}

Boxing record

|-
|Loss
|align=center| 2–1
| Borys Mańkowski
|Decision (unanimous)
| Fame 11: Fight Club
| 
|align=center|1
|align=center|15:00
|Gliwice, Poland
|
|-
|Win
|align=center| 2–0
| Maciej Jewtuszko
|Decision (majority)
| EFM Show 2: Materla vs. Rimbon
| 
|align=center|3
|align=center|3:00
|Sofia, Bulgaria
|
|-
|Win
|align=center| 1–0
| Kasjusz Życiński
|Decision (unanimous)
| Fame 10: Don Kasjo vs. Parke
| 
|align=center|5
|align=center|3:00
|Łódź, Poland
|
|}

Custom rules record

|-
|Win
|align=center|1–0
| Piotr Szeliga
|TKO (punches)
|Fame 14: Gimper vs. Tromba
|
|align=center|2
|align=center|2:13
|Kraków, Poland
|
|}

See also
 List of Irish UFC fighters
 List of current KSW fighters
 List of male mixed martial artists

References

External links
 
 

1986 births
Living people
Lightweight mixed martial artists
Male mixed martial artists from Northern Ireland
Mixed martial artists utilizing boxing
Mixed martial artists utilizing freestyle wrestling
Mixed martial artists utilizing judo
Ultimate Fighting Championship male fighters
British male sport wrestlers
Male boxers from Northern Ireland
Male judoka from Northern Ireland
Sportspeople from County Antrim